The Geneva Spur, named Eperon des Genevois and has also been called the Saddle Rib is a geological feature on Mount Everestit is a large rock buttress near the summits of Everest and Lhotse. The Geneva spur is above Camp III and the Yellow Band, but before Camp IV and South Col. It is a spur near the south col. A related formation is the saddle between the peaks of Mount Everest and Lhotse.

The Geneva Spur name comes from the 1952 Swiss Mount Everest Expedition. The spur provides a route to the South Col, and is usually traversed by climbers heading for Lhotse or Everest summits.

From the top of Geneva Spur, South Col can be seen, and when looking at it Mount Everest is on the left and Lhotse to the right. Lhotse climbers typically head southeast from Geneva Spur, and on to a couloir to ascend that summit.

History
On the 1956 Swiss Everest–Lhotse Expedition, the spur was the location of the last high camp before Fritz Luchsinger and Ernst Reiss achieved the first known ascent of Lhotse summit, on 18 May 1956.

Location on climbing routes to peaks of Everest and Lhotse
The Geneva spur is above  the Yellow Band; on the Southeast Ridge climbing route, the Geneva Spur lies above Camp III, but lower than Camp IV (as of 2003) and South Col.  The spur provides a route to the South Col, and is usually traversed by climbers heading for Lhotse or Everest summits.

Additional descriptions
The Geneva Spur, [in the 1955 translated edition of a 1952 book] "is now called the Saddle Rib. It is  flanked on either side by two steep couloirs, which after fresh falls of snow become dangerously exposed to avalanches, but after dry spells 
turn to grooves of bare ice".

References

External links
Geneva Spur (parent gallery)
Lhotse from Geneva Spur
Climbers above the spur
Climbing from Camp III to IV

Mount Everest
Mountain spurs